Sophia Ellis (born 1996) is a record-setting British female powerlifter who broke the European deadlift record of 230.5kg at the European Championships in Sweden 2021, and bronze deadlift medalist at the IPF World Classic Championships 2021. She is noted for competing for Team Great Britain, being vegan and an ambassador for eating disorder awareness after overcoming Anorexia and Bulimia Nervosa.

For several years she "battled anorexia and bulimia, culminating in being admitted to the Maudsley Hospital in Camberwell"; after recovering, she took up powerlifting, and quickly progressed to setting national records.

In April 2022, she won the British National Championships, breaking 6 British records and lifting the heaviest deadlift in British powerlifting history (237.5kg), to progress to the World Classic Championships in South Africa.

References

Living people
1996 births
British female weightlifters
Powerlifting